Albrecht, Duke of Bavaria (Albrecht Luitpold Ferdinand Michael; 3 May 1905 –  8 July 1996) was the son of the last crown prince of Bavaria, Rupprecht, and his first wife, Duchess Marie Gabrielle in Bavaria. He was the only child from that marriage that reached adulthood. His paternal grandfather was Ludwig III of Bavaria, the last king of Bavaria, who was deposed in 1918.

Life 

Following the First World War, Albrecht's grandfather King Ludwig was deposed. Albrecht and the family moved from Bavaria to the Austrian Tyrol.

Prior to the Second World War, his family, the House of Wittelsbach, were opposed to the regime of Nazi Germany and refused to join the Nazi Party. The decision meant that Prince Albrecht, who had been studying forestry, was unable to complete his studies. In 1940 Albrecht took his family to his estate at Sárvár, Vas, Hungary. In October 1944, after Germany had occupied Hungary in March, the Wittelsbachs were arrested and imprisoned in the Sachsenhausen concentration camp at Oranienburg, Brandenburg. In April 1945 they were moved to the Dachau concentration camp, where they were liberated by the United States Army.

Albrecht became head of the deposed royal family of Bavaria with the death of his father on 2 August 1955. As the eldest son of the eldest son of Archduchess Maria Theresa of Austria-Este (1849–1919), recognized by Jacobites as "Queen Mary IV (of England) and III (of Scotland)", he was also the dynastic representative and heir-general of England, Scotland and Ireland's last Stuart king, James II and VII, deposed in 1688.

In 1959 Albrecht, in an official ceremony, returned the Greek crown jewels (originally made for a Bavarian prince who reigned as Greece's first modern monarch, King Otto) to the Greek nation, accepted by King Paul of Greece.

In 1980 Albrecht presided over sumptuous ceremonies in Bavaria celebrating the 800th anniversary of the founding of the House of Wittelsbach.

Albrecht was a prolific hunter and deer researcher, collecting 3,425 sets of antlers, now partially shown in a permanent exhibition on his research activities in the former royal castle at Berchtesgaden. He also wrote two books on "the habits of deer" for which he (and his second wife) received honorary doctorates by the biological faculty of the Ludwig Maximilian University of Munich. While visiting Brazil in 1953 he encountered Brazilian Mastiffs and took some to Germany, introducing the dog breed to Europe.

His funeral at Theatine Church, Munich was conducted by Friedrich Wetter, the Archbishop of Munich. He was buried on a family graveyard he himself had installed in 1977 at Andechs Abbey.

Marriages and children
Albrecht married Countess Maria Draskovich of Trakostjan (8 March 1904 in Vienna – 10 June 1969 in Wildbad Kreuth) on 3 September 1930 in Berchtesgaden. Daughter of Count Dionys Maria Draskovich von Trakostjan and Princess Juliana Rose von Montenuovo (a great-granddaughter of Marie-Louise of Austria, sometime Empress of the French), she belonged to a family of the Croatian nobility known since 1230 and made Imperial counts in 1631. Although Albrecht's father allowed the wedding, a Wittelsbach family council concluded that the marriage was non-compliant with the dynasty's marital tradition as set out in its historical house laws, and the names of the couple's four children were excluded from the Almanach de Gotha. In 1948, however, a juridical consultation advised that the head of the house has sole authority to determine the validity of marriages within the House of Wittelsbach, prompting Crown Prince Rupprecht to recognize Albrecht's marriage as dynastic on 18 May 1949.

On 21 April 1971 in Weichselboden, Albrecht married Countess Marie-Jenke Keglevich of Buzin (23 April 1921 in Budapest – 5 October 1983 in Weichselboden), daughter of Count Stephan Keglevich de Buzin and Countess Klára Zichy of Zich and Vásonkeö. They had no children.

At the time of his death, Albrecht had four children from his first marriage, fifteen grandchildren and twenty-six great-grandchildren. His children are:

 Princess Marie Gabrielle (b. 1931), married 1957 Georg, Prince von Waldburg zu Zeil und Trauchburg (1928-2015)
 Princess Marie Charlotte (1931-2018), married 1955 Paul, Prince von Quadt zu Wykradt und Isny (1930-2011)
 Franz, Duke of Bavaria (b. 1933)
 Prince Max, Duke in Bavaria (b. 1937), married 1967 Countess Elisabeth Douglas (b. 1940), great-granddaughter of Philipp, Prince of Eulenburg

Honours and styles

Titles and styles
Albrecht was styled Prinz von Bayern (Prince of Bavaria) at birth. After the death of his father in 1955 he changed his style to Herzog von Bayern (Duke of Bavaria).

As head of the House of Wittelsbach, Albrecht was traditionally styled as His Royal Highness the Duke of Bavaria, of Franconia and in Swabia, Count Palatine of the Rhine.

Dynastic honours
  Württemberg Royal Family: Knight Grand Cross of the Royal Order of the Crown, Special Class
  Austro-Hungarian Imperial and Royal Family: Knight of the Order of the Golden Fleece, 1953

Foreign honours
 : Knight Grand Cross with Collar of the Order of the Holy Sepulchre
 : Knight Grand Cross of the Order of Merit of the Principality of Liechtenstein, Grand Star

Ancestry

References

Bibliography

1905 births
1996 deaths
House of Wittelsbach
Princes of Bavaria
Jacobite pretenders
Pretenders to the Bavarian throne
Knights of the Golden Fleece of Austria
Dachau concentration camp survivors
Sachsenhausen concentration camp survivors
Burials at Andechs Abbey
Knights of the Holy Sepulchre